Jatiya Press Club  is the professional club for journalists of Bangladesh located in the capital Dhaka. The current president is Farida Yasmin and the General Secretary is Shyamal Dutta.

History

The Jatiya Press Club was founded in 1954 as the East Pakistan Press Club. It was formed to be run by an elected committee guided by its rules and regulations. The Government of East Pakistan rented out a building at 18 Topkhana Road at a monthly rent of Tk 100 to be used as the press club headquarters. The building before 1947 was a residential house of Dhaka University and was once residence to physicist Satyendra Nath Bose.

The first life member of the club was N. M. Khan who was chief secretary of the provincial government. Mujibur Rahman Khan was the first president of the club. On 25 March Pakistan army started Operation Searchlight and shelled the club, the structure was completely destroyed. After the Independence of Bangladesh it was named the National Press club. In 1977 the building was leased to the club permanently and the government of Bangladesh covered the expense of a new building. In 1995 the club's logo and emblem were selected.

From 2018 to 2020, Saiful Alam was the President and  the general secretary was Farida Yasmin, the first woman general secretary of the Jatiya Press club. Farida Yasmin was elected president in 2020, the first woman president of the Jatiya Press Club, and Elias Khan was elected general secretary. Farida Yasmin was re-elected president of the Jatiya Press Club and Shyamal Dutta was elected general secretary.

Structure
The Jatiya Press Club has three of membership, first is life membership, second  is permanent membership for professional journalists and the third is associate membership for public relations personnel. Associate members do not get voting rights. The National Press club currently has about 800 members. The press club is managed by a 17-member executive council.

References

1954 establishments in East Pakistan
Clubs and societies in Bangladesh
Press clubs
Organisations based in Dhaka
Bangladeshi journalism organisations